Tsitika Mountain is a mountain on Vancouver Island, British Columbia, Canada, located  southeast of Telegraph Cove and  northwest of Mount Abel.

See also
 List of mountains of Canada

References

Vancouver Island Ranges
One-thousanders of British Columbia
Rupert Land District